is a Japanese football player.

External links
 
 

1987 births
Living people
Japanese footballers
Japanese expatriate footballers
Kazuto Kushida
Kazuto Kushida
J3 League players
Iwate Grulla Morioka players
Expatriate footballers in Thailand
Japanese expatriate sportspeople in Thailand
Sportspeople from Kyoto
Association football midfielders
Wollongong United FC players